The 2016 La Course by Le Tour de France was the third edition of La Course by Le Tour de France, a one-day women's cycle race held in France. The race was held before the final stage of the 2016 Tour de France on 24 July. It was organised by the ASO and is part of the UCI Women's World Tour.

Route

Teams competing

Race

Result

See also
 2016 in women's road cycling

References

External links

 

La Course
La Course by Le Tour de France
La Course